Glastonbury and Street railway station was the biggest station on the original Somerset and Dorset Joint Railway main line from Highbridge to Evercreech Junction until closed in 1966 under the Beeching axe. It was the junction for the short branch line to Wells which closed in 1951.

Opened in 1854 as Glastonbury, and renamed in 1886, it had three platforms, two for Evercreech to Highbridge services and one for the branch service to Wells. The station had a large goods yard controlled from a signal box.

Services

The site today

The site is now used by a timber merchant and for storage. Replica level crossing gates have been placed at the entrance.
The former railway station canopy is now used as a shelter in the market area car park in Glastonbury.

References

External links

 Station on navigable O.S. map

Disused railway stations in Somerset
Former Somerset and Dorset Joint Railway stations
Railway stations in Great Britain opened in 1854
Railway stations in Great Britain closed in 1966
Beeching closures in England
Glastonbury
Buildings and structures in Mendip District